Kuh-e Sefid (also Romanized as Kūh-e Sefīd and Kūh Sefīd) is a village in Bakharz Rural District, in the Central District of Bakharz County, Razavi Khorasan Province, Iran. At the 2006 census, its population was 919, in 183 families.

References 

Populated places in Bakharz County